Buick is the seventh studio album by American country music band Sawyer Brown. Released in 1991 on Capitol Records, it features the singles "One Less Pony", "Mama's Little Baby Loves Me" and "The Walk". Although these first two singles reached the lower portions of the Billboard country music charts, "The Walk" peaked at #2, and was reprised on the band's 1992 album The Dirt Road.

Track listing

Personnel 
As listed in liner notes

Sawyer Brown
 Mark Miller – lead vocals
 Gregg "Hobie" Hubbard – keyboards, backing vocals
 Bobby Randall – lead guitars, backing vocals
 Jim Scholten – bass
 Joe "Curley" Smyth – drums, percussion

Additional musicians
 John Barlow Jarvis – keyboards, acoustic piano
 Mike Lawler – synthesizers
 Joe Erkman – electric guitar
 Steve Gibson – acoustic guitar
 Don Potter – acoustic guitar
 Randy Scruggs – acoustic guitar, electric guitar
 Glen Duncan – fiddle, mandolin
 Eddie Bayers – drums
 Donna McElroy – lead and backing vocals (8)
 Bob Bailey – backing vocals (8)
 Vicki Hampton – backing vocals (8)
 Mac McAnally – vocal arrangements

Production 
 Mark Miller – producer 
 Randy Scruggs – producer 
 Ron "Snake" Reynolds – recording, mixing 
 Jeff Coppage – assistant engineer 
 Milan Bogdan – digital editing 
 Glenn Meadows – mastering at Masterfonics (Nashville, Tennessee)
 Buddy Jackson – art direction
 Beth Middleworth – design 
 Peter Nash – photography 
 T.K.O Artist Management – management

Charts

Weekly charts

Year-end charts

References

1991 albums
Capitol Records albums
Sawyer Brown albums